Lakeland is a city in Lanier County, Georgia, United States. The city is the county seat of Lanier County. It is part of the Valdosta, Georgia Metropolitan Statistical Area. The population was 3,366 at the 2010 census.

Originally called Alapaha and then Milltown or Mill Town, Lakeland received its current name in 1925 in honor of its proximity to Grand Bay Lake, Lake Irma, and Banks Lake. For many years, Lakeland owned and operated its own railroad.

 The town has an array of festival all year long, including Market Day & ‘LA DAY. This is a celebration among the African Americans of the surrounding counties to come and enjoy vendors and music, though usually called off by nightfall by local law enforcement. The town also is one of the few cities in Georgia with murals of both slaves & plantation owners.

History
By the late 1830s, a community known as Alapaha had come into existence along the road from Waresboro, Georgia to Troupville, Georgia near the mill established by Joshua Lee on what is now Banks Lake National Wildlife Refuge. In 1838, a post office was established and was officially named Alapaha after the nearby Alapaha River. In 1848, Joshua Lee sold his mill to William Lastinger. In the 1850s, additional mills were established in the area and the population of the community continued to grow. In 1857, Alapaha was renamed Milltown. During the American Civil, William Lastinger sold his mill to Henry Banks. Milltown was incorporated in 1901. In 1919, Milltown was designated seat of the newly formed Lanier County. In 1928, the city was incorporated and renamed to its present form of Lakeland.

Geography
Lakeland is located at  (31.039214, -83.070397).

Demographics

2020 census

As of the 2020 United States census, there were 2,875 people, 997 households, and 631 families residing in the city.

2000 census
As of the census of 2000, there were 2,730 people, 966 households, and 661 families residing in the city. The racial makeup of the city was 67.18% White, 29.27% African American, 0.66% Native American, 0.48% Asian, 0.77% from other races, and 1.65% from two or more races. Hispanic or Latino of any race were 2.86% of the population.

There were 966 households, out of which 34.3% had children under the age of 18 living with them, 42.7% were married couples living together, 20.5% had a female householder with no husband present, and 31.5% were non-families. 29.0% of all households were made up of individuals, and 14.1% had someone living alone who was 65 years of age or older.  The average household size was 2.54 and the average family size was 3.10.

In the city, the population was spread out, with 26.6% under the age of 18, 11.8% from 18 to 24, 28.9% from 25 to 44, 19.1% from 45 to 64, and 13.6% who were 65 years of age or older.  The median age was 34 years. For every 100 females, there were 102.5 males.  For every 100 females age 18 and over, there were 103.9 males.

The median income for a household in the city was $22,346, and the median income for a family was $28,487. Males had a median income of $23,457 versus $19,276 for females. The per capita income for the city was $13,156.  About 25.3% of families and 28.8% of the population were below the poverty line, including 38.9% of those under age 18 and 33.3% of those age 65 or over.

Education 

The Lanier County School District holds grades pre-school to grade twelve, and consists of two elementary schools, a middle school, and a high school. The district has 94 full-time teachers and over 1,345 students.
Lanier County Primary School
Lanier County Elementary School
Lanier County Middle School
Lanier County High School

The South Georgia Regional Library operates the W. L. Miller Memorial Library in Lakeland. Initially the community was served by a library that was only open during school periods, and therefore people in the community considered it to be a school library rather than a complete community library. This small library opened in the courthouse office of the superintendent of the county school system in 1950. It was relocated to the Lanier County Primary School's Kindergarten building and then to a portion of Lanier County High School. The first standalone library, then the Lanier-Lakeland Library, opened on May 18, 1980. The current facility, built as part of a State of Georgia grant-funded library wave and partially financed by the W. L. Miller family through a $45,000 donation, opened on March 13, 1988. It was renovated from August 9 through August 23 in 2012.

References

Cities in Georgia (U.S. state)
Cities in Lanier County, Georgia
County seats in Georgia (U.S. state)
Cities in the Valdosta metropolitan area